Goldbach's conjecture is one of the oldest and best-known unsolved problems in number theory and all of mathematics. It states that every even natural number greater than 2 is the sum of two prime numbers.

The conjecture has been shown to hold for all integers less than 4 × 1018, but remains unproven despite considerable effort.

History
On 7 June 1742, the German mathematician Christian Goldbach wrote a letter to Leonhard Euler (letter XLIII), in which he proposed the following conjecture:

Goldbach was following the now-abandoned convention of considering 1 to be a prime number, so that a sum of units would indeed be a sum of primes.
He then proposed a second conjecture in the margin of his letter, which implies the first:

Euler replied in a letter dated 30 June 1742 and reminded Goldbach of an earlier conversation they had had, in which Goldbach had remarked that the first of those two conjectures would follow from the statement

This is in fact equivalent to his second, marginal conjecture.
In the letter dated 30 June 1742, Euler stated:

Each of the three conjectures above has a natural analog in terms of the modern definition of a prime, under which 1 is excluded.
A modern version of the first conjecture is:

A modern version of the marginal conjecture is:

And a modern version of Goldbach's older conjecture of which Euler reminded him is:

These modern versions might not be entirely equivalent to the corresponding original statements. For example, if there were an even integer  larger than 4, for  a prime, that could not be expressed as the sum of two primes in the modern sense, then it would  be a counterexample to the modern version of the third conjecture (without being a counterexample to the original version). The modern version is thus probably stronger (but in order to confirm that, one would have to prove that the first version, freely applied to any positive even integer , could not possibly rule out the existence of such a specific counterexample ). In any case, the modern statements have the same relationships with each other as the older statements did. That is, the second and third modern statements are equivalent, and either implies the first modern statement.

The third modern statement (equivalent to the second) is the form in which the conjecture is usually expressed today. It is also known as the "strong", "even", or "binary" Goldbach conjecture. A weaker form of the second modern statement, known as "Goldbach's weak conjecture", the "odd Goldbach conjecture", or the "ternary Goldbach conjecture", asserts that 

A proof for the weak conjecture was proposed in 2013 by Harald Helfgott. Helfgott's proof has not yet appeared in a peer-reviewed publication, though was accepted for publication in the Annals of Mathematics Studies series in 2015 and has been undergoing further review and revision since. The weak conjecture would be a corollary of the strong conjecture: if  is a sum of two primes, then  is a sum of three primes. However, the converse implication and thus the strong Goldbach conjecture remain unproven.

Verified results
For small values of n, the strong Goldbach conjecture (and hence the weak Goldbach conjecture) can be verified directly.  For instance, in 1938, Nils Pipping laboriously verified the conjecture up to n ≤ 105.  With the advent of computers, many more values of n have been checked; T. Oliveira e Silva ran a distributed computer search that has verified the conjecture for n ≤ 4 × 1018 (and double-checked up to 4 × 1017) as of 2013. One record from this search is that  is the smallest number that cannot be written as a sum of two primes where one is smaller than 9781.

Heuristic justification

Statistical considerations that focus on the probabilistic distribution of prime numbers present informal evidence in favour of the conjecture (in both the weak and strong forms) for sufficiently large integers: the greater the integer, the more ways there are available for that number to be represented as the sum of two or three other numbers, and the more "likely" it becomes that at least one of these representations consists entirely of primes.

A very crude version of the heuristic probabilistic argument (for the strong form of the Goldbach conjecture) is as follows. The prime number theorem asserts that an integer m selected at random has roughly a  chance of being prime.  Thus if n is a large even integer and m is a number between 3 and n/2, then one might expect the probability of m and n − m simultaneously being prime to be .  If one pursues this heuristic, one might expect the total number of ways to write a large even integer n as the sum of two odd primes to be roughly

 

Since , this quantity goes to infinity as n increases, and one would expect that every large even integer has not just one representation as the sum of two primes, but in fact very many such representations.

This heuristic argument is actually somewhat inaccurate, because it assumes that the events of m and n − m being prime are statistically independent of each other.  For instance, if m is odd, then n − m is also odd, and if m is even, then n − m is even, a non-trivial relation because, besides the number 2, only odd numbers can be prime.  Similarly, if n is divisible by 3, and m was already a prime distinct from 3, then n − m would also be coprime to 3 and thus be slightly more likely to be prime than a general number.  Pursuing this type of analysis more carefully, G. H. Hardy and John Edensor Littlewood in 1923 conjectured (as part of their Hardy–Littlewood prime tuple conjecture) that for any fixed c ≥ 2, the number of representations of a large integer n as the sum of c primes  with  should be asymptotically equal to

 

 in modular arithmetic, subject to the constraints .  This formula has been rigorously proven to be asymptotically valid for c ≥ 3 from the work of Ivan Matveevich Vinogradov, but is still only a conjecture when . In the latter case, the above formula simplifies to 0 when n is odd, and to

 

when n is even, where  is Hardy–Littlewood's twin prime constant

 

This is sometimes known as the extended Goldbach conjecture. The strong Goldbach conjecture is in fact very similar to the twin prime conjecture, and the two conjectures are believed to be of roughly comparable difficulty.

The Goldbach partition function is the function that associates to each even integer the number of ways it can be decomposed into a sum of two primes. Its graph looks as a comet, and is therefore called Goldbach's comet.

Goldbach's comet suggests tight upper and lower bounds on the number of representations of an even number as the sum of two primes, and also that the number of these representations depend strongly on the value modulo  of the number.

Rigorous results
The strong Goldbach conjecture is much more difficult than the weak Goldbach conjecture. In 1930, Lev Schnirelmann proved that any natural number greater than 1 can be written as the sum of not more than  prime numbers, where  is an effectively computable constant; see Schnirelmann density. Schnirelmann's constant is the lowest number  with this property. Schnirelmann himself obtained  < . This result was subsequently enhanced by many authors, such as Olivier Ramaré, who in 1995 showed that every even number  is in fact the sum of at most 6 primes. The best known result currently stems from the proof of the weak Goldbach conjecture by Harald Helfgott, which directly implies that every even number  is the sum of at most 4 primes.

In 1948, using sieve theory, Alfréd Rényi showed that every sufficiently large even number can be written as the sum of a prime and an almost prime with at most K factors. Chen Jingrun showed in 1973 using the methods of sieve theory that every sufficiently large even number can be written as the sum of either two primes, or a prime and a semiprime (the product of two primes). See Chen's theorem for further information.

In 1975, Hugh Montgomery and Robert Charles Vaughan showed that "most" even numbers are expressible as the sum of two primes. In particular, the set of even integers that are not the sum of two primes has density zero.

In 1951, Yuri Linnik proved the existence of a constant  such that every sufficiently large even number is the sum of two primes and at most  powers of 2.  Roger Heath-Brown and Jan-Christoph Schlage-Puchta found in 2002 that  works.

Related problems 
Although Goldbach's conjecture implies that every positive integer greater than one can be written as a sum of at most three primes, it is not always possible to find such a sum using a greedy algorithm that uses the largest possible prime at each step. The Pillai sequence tracks the numbers requiring the largest number of primes in their greedy representations.

Similar problems to Goldbach's conjecture exist in which primes are replaced by other particular sets of numbers, such as the squares:
 It was proven by Lagrange that every positive integer is the sum of four squares.  See Waring's problem and the related Waring–Goldbach problem on sums of powers of primes.
 Hardy and Littlewood listed as their Conjecture I: "Every large odd number (n > 5) is the sum of a prime and the double of a prime" (Mathematics Magazine, 66.1 (1993): 45–47). This conjecture is known as Lemoine's conjecture and is also called Levy's conjecture.
 The Goldbach conjecture for practical numbers, a prime-like sequence of integers, was stated by Margenstern in 1984, and proved by Melfi in 1996: every even number is a sum of two practical numbers.
 A strengthening of the Goldbach conjecture proposed by Harvey Dubner states that every even integer greater than 4,208 is the sum of two twin primes. Only 34 even integers less than 4,208 are not the sum of two twin primes. A proof of this stronger conjecture would not only imply Goldbach's conjecture, but also the twin prime conjecture.

In popular culture
Goldbach's Conjecture is the title of the biography of Chinese mathematician and number theorist Chen Jingrun, written by Xu Chi.

The conjecture is a central point in the plot of the 1992 novel Uncle Petros and Goldbach's Conjecture by Greek author Apostolos Doxiadis, in the short story "Sixty Million Trillion Combinations" by Isaac Asimov and also in the 2008 mystery novel No One You Know by Michelle Richmond.

Goldbach's conjecture is part of the plot of the 2007 Spanish film Fermat's Room.

References

Further reading 
 
 
 Terence Tao proved that all odd numbers are at most the sum of five primes.
 Goldbach Conjecture at MathWorld.

External links 

 
 Goldbach's original letter to Euler — PDF format (in German and Latin)
Goldbach's conjecture, part of Chris Caldwell's Prime Pages.
Goldbach conjecture verification, Tomás Oliveira e Silva's distributed computer search.

Additive number theory
Analytic number theory
Conjectures about prime numbers
Unsolved problems in number theory
Hilbert's problems